Floodsim is a flash-based serious game created by Norwich Union in cooperation with Playgen in 2008 in order to raise awareness of the dangers that flooding present to the United Kingdom. The goal of the game is to protect the people of the United Kingdom from floods that damage the economy and lives of the people through an assortment of realistic means over a time span of three years.

Key themes
In order to help raise awareness of the problem of flooding, Floodsim highlights:
 Long term strategy and creating targets for flood prevention
 The importance of better flood planning 
 The importance of getting communities involved in flood prevention
 Finding new ways to reduce surface water flooding by promoting better drainage
 The option of flood resilient measures for houses and businesses.

Gameplay

FloodSim is a turn-based strategy game using a drag and drop interface. A play session is broken into three years, each with different success requirements. Each year ends when either the player has run out of money or chooses to advance the game forward.

Reactions
The project also has received backing from the then Environment Minister Phil Woolas who said “The floods of 2007 show just how serious flooding can be, and I am glad to see that this project has been developed to enable people to have a greater understanding of the risk of flooding. A number of decisions need to be taken when we look at managing the risk of flooding – including our annual spend on flood defenses, where and how we build new houses, and the emergency response procedures we have in place for times of flood. This game gives the game player the opportunity to make informed decisions about all of these policy areas.”

In 2009 a paper was presented at SIGGRAPH Symposium on Video Games regarding the societal impact of FloodSim.

References

External links
 [dead link that points to a spam site containing a dangerous download]

Environmental education video games
Floods in the United Kingdom
Humanitarian video games
Video games developed in the United Kingdom